The 1990 Brentwood Borough Council election took place on 3 May 1990 to elect members of Brentwood Borough Council in England.

Results summary

Ward results

Brentwood North

Brentwood South

Brentwood West

Brizes & Doddinghurst

Hutton East

Hutton North

Hutton South

Ingatestone & Fryerning

Pilgrims Hatch

Shenfield

South Weald

Warley

West Horndon

References

1990
1990 English local elections